Endalma Sillipseos (trans. Ένταλμα Συλλήψεως; Arrest Warrant) is the third album by Greek artist Katy Garbi. It was released on 27 September 1991 by Sony Music Greece, eventually selling 25,000 units, just short of a gold certification. The digital edition of the album includes prior singles from her first two albums as a bonus, due to her growing popularity. The album contains her first successful songs, like "Endalma Sillipseos", "Prosopo Me Prosopo" and "Fimes".

Track listing 

 † only on the CD issue of the album

Singles and Music videos
The following singles were officially released to radio stations and made into music videos, except the song "Fimes".

"Endalma Sillipseos" (Arrest Warrant)
"Prosopo Me Prosopo" (Face To Face)
"Svise Me" (Erase Me)
"Thelo Na Kano Mazi Sou Mia Trela" (I Want To Do Something Crazy With You)
"Fimes" (Rumours)

Credits and Personnel
Credits adapted from the album's liner notes.

Personnel 
Ilias Achladiotis: keyboards, orchestration, programming (tracks: 3, 8, 9)
Katerina Adamantidou: backing vocals (tracks: 2, 4, 6, 10)
Charis Andreadis: keyboards, orchestration (tracks: 1, 2, 4, 5, 6, 7, 10)
Dimitris Barbagalas: guitars (tracks: 2, 7, 8, 9)
Stelios Goulielmos: backing vocals (tracks: 2, 4, 6, 10)
Antonis Gounaris: guitars (tracks: 1, 3, 4, 5, 10)
Charis Kelaris: bass: (tracks: 1, 2, 5, 8, 9)
Avet Kizirian (tracks: 1, 2, 4, 5, 6, 7, 10)
Lazaros Koulaxizis: accordion (tracks: 5)
Sandy Politi: backing vocals (tracks: 2, 4, 6, 10)
Stefanos Stefanopoulos: flute (tracks: 7)
Takis Paterelis: saxophone (tracks: 1, 7, 9)
Notis Sfakianakis: second vocal (tracks: 1, 5)

Production 
Makis Achladiotis (Sierra studio): sound engineer (tracks: 3, 8, 9)
Achilleas Charitos: make up, styling
Dinos Diamantopoulos: photographer
Giannis Doulamis: executive producer
Kostas Giannakopoulos (Digital studio): sound engineer (tracks: 1, 2, 4, 5, 6, 7, 10)
Akis Gounaris: art direction
Giannis Ioannidis (D.P.H.): mastering
Panagiotis Petronikolos (Sierra studio): mix engineer

References

1991 albums
Katy Garbi albums
Greek-language albums
Sony Music Greece albums